Innocenzo da Berzo (19 March 1844 - 3 March 1890), born Giovanni Scalvinoni, was an Italian Roman Catholic priest and a professed member of the Order of Friars Minor - or Capuchin branch of the Franciscan Order. Scalvinoni assumed his new religious name upon his profession as a Capuchin friar.

Pope John XXIII beatified him on 12 November 1961.

Life
Giovanni Scalvinoni was born on 19 March 1844 to Pietro Scalvinoni and Francesca Poli in Niardo (Brescia). He was baptized Giovanni. His father died of pneumonia when Giovanni was three months old in June 1844. He spent his childhood in Berzo.

As a small child he had great mercy for the poor, giving generously to those who asked, even though his family was in need. From 1855 to 1860 he attended the municipal college in Lovere in the province of Bergamo and he passed with high marks. In 1864 he entered the diocesan seminary of Brescia. He was ordained to the priesthood on 2 June 1867 and held some positions, including that of vice-chancellor of the seminary, but each time he was removed because his innate shyness made it difficult to impose authority. He was assigned as the parochial vicar at the parish of Cevo in Valsaviore. In 1870 he returned to Berzo Inferiore where his duties were to act as a confessor and to direct the local primary school. During the time in the parish he found a need for solitude, prayer and penance. In 1873 he entered the Order of Friars Minor at the Annunciata Convent in the village of Borno. In 1877 he later he made his solemn vows and took the name of "Innocenzo of Berzo".

Except for short assignments of preaching spiritual exercises in some convents in Lombardy, he remained at the Annunicata Convent.  There he lived a life of intense abandonment, living the adage of "do good and disappear".  He had a deep devotion to the Blessed Sacrament, finding his sustenance in front of the Tabernacle. He also had a devotion to the crucified Jesus Christ, and encouraged penitents to the exercise of the Way of the Cross.

On 3 March 1890 he died in the infirmary of the convent of the Capuchin friars in Bergamo. From 26 to 28 September of the same year his body was transferred to the cemetery of Berzo Inferiore in a trip defined as "the last itinerant adventure connected to the earthly world of the little friar from Berzo". The mortal remains of Innocenzo from Berzo arrived in Vallecamonica some months after his death. Even though the news went slower than now, a great number of people asked the Conventual house, where his body was resting, to have a relic of his mortal remains. Once the people obtained the permission, on 28 September, nearly seven months after his death, the body was arranged in a coffin and then carried on the shoulders of his Franciscan brethren and was taken to his last resting-place.

Beatification

There are two miracles attributed to the late friar. The first is a cure of a male child at the age of four from an aggressive form of leukemia. The second is the cure of another male child of the age of five from peritonitis.

Pope John XXIII presided over the beatification of Innocenzo da Berzo on 12 November 1961 and made him the patron of both Berzo and of children.

References

External links
Sanctuario della Ss.ma Annunciata e del Beato Innocenzo
Capuchin Franciscan Province of St. Mary
Saints SQPN

1844 births
1890 deaths
19th-century venerated Christians
19th-century Italian Roman Catholic priests
Beatifications by Pope John XXIII
Capuchins
Italian beatified people
Religious leaders from the Province of Brescia